Harry Kay (23 March 1883–1954) was an English footballer who played in the Football League for Bolton Wanderers, Leeds City and Swindon Town.

References

1883 births
1954 deaths
English footballers
Association football defenders
English Football League players
Bolton Wanderers F.C. players
Leeds City F.C. players
Swindon Town F.C. players